Nepal Peak is a peak, 1203 m, at the north end of Goorkha Craters, Cook Mountains. Named by Advisory Committee on Antarctic Names (US-ACAN) in association with Goorkha Craters (Gurkha), a name applied by R.F. Scott, 1901–04.

Mountains of Oates Land